Corey Waddell (born 2 October 1996) is a professional rugby league footballer who plays as a  forward for the Canterbury-Bankstown Bulldogs in the NRL. 

He previously played for the Manly Warringah Sea Eagles in the National Rugby League.

Background
Waddell was born in Sydney, New South Wales, Australia. He is the son of former Penrith Panthers and Illawarra Steelers player Steve Waddell. 

Waddell played his junior rugby league for Emu Plains JRLFC, before signing with Penrith Panthers.

Playing career

2019
In round 2 of the 2019 NRL season, Waddell made his NRL debut for Manly-Warringah against the Sydney Roosters. In the 2019 Semi-Final against South Sydney, Waddell scored his first NRL try in a 34–26 loss at ANZ Stadium.

2020
Waddell played 13 games for Manly in the 2020 NRL season as the club missed the finals.  He then signed a deal to join Canterbury-Bankstown for the 2021 season.

2021
Waddell made a total of 20 appearances for Canterbury in the 2021 NRL season as the club finished last and claimed the Wooden Spoon.

2022
On 26 July, Waddell was suspended for five games after being found guilty of eye gouging an opponent during Canterbury's round 19 victory over the Gold Coast.
Waddell played a total of 17 matches for Canterbury in the 2022 NRL season as the club finished 12th on the table.

References

External links
Canterbury Bulldogs profile
NRL profile
Manly Sea Eagles profile

1996 births
Living people
Australian rugby league players
Canterbury-Bankstown Bulldogs players
Rugby league players from Sydney
Rugby league second-rows
Manly Warringah Sea Eagles players